Istanbul is a Turkish province divided into three electoral districts of the Grand National Assembly of Turkey. It elects ninety-eight members of parliament (deputies) to represent the province of the same name for a five-year term by the D'Hondt method, a party-list proportional representation system.

The first district is situated on the Anatolian side of İstanbul on the east of the Bosphorus. The second and third electoral district are both on the European side, with the third situated to the west of the second. The first and third districts, electing 35 MPs, are the largest electoral districts of Turkey in terms of members elected.

Members 
Population reviews of each electoral district are conducted before each general election, which can lead to certain districts being granted a smaller or greater number of parliamentary seats. Istanbul has the largest number of allocated seats and also the largest number of electoral districts within its provincial boundaries.

The province's administrative districts (ilçe) are divided among three electoral districts as follows:

General elections

2011

June 2015

November 2015

2018

Presidential elections

2014

References 

Politics of Istanbul Province